Mastophora dizzydeani is a species of spider named after baseball player Dizzy Dean. Like all known species of the genus Mastophora, adult females are bolas spiders, capturing their prey with one or more sticky drops at the end of a single line of silk rather than in a web. Males and juvenile females capture their prey directly with their legs.

See also
List of organisms named after famous people (born 1900–1949)

References

Araneidae
Spiders of South America
Spiders described in 1984